Sylt Air GmbH is an airline based at Sylt-Ost, Germany, operating chartered and scheduled flights from Sylt Airport.

History
The company was founded in 1963 by Ulrich Schreiber as Friesenflug. From 1978 until 1998 the Polish pilot Kasimir Samp and his wife Ursula owned the company. In 1998, it was sold to Aeroline. Celebrities like playboy Günter Sachs, actor Charles Brauer, comedian Karl Dall, box-champion Dariusz Michalczewski or designer Brigitte Stohlmann frequently were on board on the scheduled flights from Hamburg.

Destinations
Sylt Air operates summer seasonal scheduled flights between Sylt Airport and Hamburg Airport. It also offers scenic flights around Sylt and the Frisian Islands as well as other charter operations. 
During the summer time 2023 a connection to Dortmund is going to be established.

Fleet

As of November 2020, the Sylt air fleet includes:

Former Friesenflug fleet:
Cessna 182 (D-EGTD)
Cessna 172 (D-EGAZ)
Cessna 172 (D-EOTI)
Cessna 207 (D-ECMB)
Piper Seneca (D-GIWA)

References

External links

 Official website

Airlines established in 1963
Airlines of Germany
Sylt